Dihydrobenzophenanthridine oxidase (DHBP oxidase) is an enzyme.

Dihydrobenzophenanthridine oxidase produces oxidized forms of benzophenanthridine alkaloids:
 In Sanguinaria canadensis (bloodroot), dihydrobenzophenanthridine oxidase produces sanguinarine from dihydrosanguinarine, and chelirubine from dihydrochelirubine.
 In Eschscholzia californica (California poppy), dihydrobenzophenanthridine oxidase produces macarpine from dihydromacarpine.

External links
 Chelirubine, Macarpine and Sanguinarine Biosynthesis
 
 
 
 KEGG (Kyoto Encyclopedia of Genes and Genomes) Alkaloid biosynthesis I - Reference pathway

EC 1.5.3